Ika-6 na Utos (pronounced as Ika-anim na Utos / international title: A Woman Scorned / ) is a Philippine television drama revenge series broadcast by GMA Network. Directed by Laurice Guillen, it stars Sunshine Dizon, Gabby Concepcion and Ryza Cenon. It premiered on December 5, 2016 on the network's Afternoon Prime line up replacing Oh, My Mama!. On April 1, 2017, it joined the network's Sabado Star Power sa Hapon line up replacing Case Solved. The series concluded on March 17, 2018 with a total of 383 episodes. It was replaced by Contessa in its timeslot.

The series is streaming online on YouTube.

Premise
Rome and Emma have problems and when issues arise, their marriage is in jeopardy. Rome eventually meets Georgia, who will become his mistress.

Cast and characters

Lead cast
 Sunshine Dizon as Emma Doqueza de Jesus-Fuentabella
 Gabby Concepcion as Jerome "Rome" Fuentabella / Jordan "Boss J" Francisco
 Ryza Cenon as Georgia "Adyang" Ferrer / Athena Francisco 

Supporting cast
 Mike Tan as Angelo Trinidad
 Rich Asuncion as Flora "Flor" Trinidad
 Daria Ramirez as Lourdes Doqueza-de Jesus
 Carmen Soriano as Margarita vda. de Fuentabella
 Marco Alcaraz as Chandler Vasquez
 Mel Martinez as Zeny 
 Arianne Bautista as Anselma "Selma" Del Rosario

Recurring cast
 Zach Briz as young Austin
 Odette Khan as Loleng / Consuelo Domingo vda. de Guidotti
 Marife Necesito as Vicky
 Ollie Espino as Mando
 Rosemarie Sarita as Mildred Ferrer
 Eunice Lagusad as Becca
 Angelica Ulip as Sydney Ferrer Fuentabella / Milan de Jesus Fuentabella
 Cai Cortez as Charlotte Amalie "Char" Ledesma
 Pen Medina as Antonio “Noel” de Jesus
 Jacob Briz as Austin de Jesus Fuentabella
Angelika Dela Cruz as Geneva "Gengen" Ferrer-Takahashi

Guest cast
 Elijah Alejo as young Emma
 Karel Marquez as Lara Salcedo-Fuentabella
 Lito Legaspi as Allan
 Toby Alejar as Orlando
 Anna Marin as Anita
 Marcus Madrigal as Dave
 Sheila Marie Rodriguez as Cynthia
 Allan Paule as Danilo
 Luane Dy as a television host 
 Aprilyn Gustillo as Grace
 Zoren Legaspi as Lyon Muller
 Chynna Ortaleza as Maui Alcaraz
 Leanne Bautista as Chelsea Muller
 Lharby Policarpio as Morgan
 Vince Gamad as Darwin
 Elle Ramirez as Kenya
 Marnie Lapuz as Chona
 Bryan Benedict as Nato
 Ranty Portento as Brian Santiago
 Izzy Trazona-Aragon as Alberta Alcaraz-Muller

Ratings
According to AGB Nielsen Philippines' Nationwide Urban Television Audience Measurement, the pilot episode of Ika-6 na Utos earned an
11.9% rating. While the final episode scored an 8.6% rating. The series had its highest rating on people in television homes on July 28, 2017 with a 10.7% rating.

Accolades

References

External links
 
 

2016 Philippine television series debuts
2018 Philippine television series endings
Filipino-language television shows
GMA Network drama series
Television series about revenge
Adultery in television
Television shows set in the Philippines